Dan Fagin (born February 1, 1963) is an American journalist who specializes in environmental science. He won the 2014 Pulitzer Prize for General Nonfiction for his best-selling book Toms River: A Story of Science and Salvation.  Toms River also won the Helen Bernstein Book Award for Excellence in Journalism, the National Academies Communication Award, and the Rachel Carson Environment Book Award of the Society of Environmental Journalists, among other literary prizes.

Early life
Fagin was born in Oklahoma City and attended high school at Bishop McGuinness Catholic High School, where he was friends with another future author, Blake Bailey.  Fagin graduated in 1985 from Dartmouth College, where he served as the editor-in-chief of The Dartmouth (the college's daily newspaper).

Career
From 1991-2005, Fagin was the environmental writer at Newsday, where he was a principal member of two reporting teams that were finalists for the Pulitzer Prize. Fagin is a former president of the Society of Environmental Journalists. In 2003, his stories about cancer epidemiology won the Science Journalism Award of the American Association for the Advancement of Science, and also won the Science-in-Society Award of the National Association of Science Writers.

Fagin is a Professor of Journalism at the Arthur L. Carter Journalism Institute at New York University, and the director of the NYU Science, Health and Environmental Reporting Program. He is also the founder and director of the NYU Science Communication Workshops. His book Toms River: A Story of Science and Salvation was published March 19, 2013. In a review, Abigail Zuger in the New York Times called it "a new classic of science reporting." He is also the co-author with Marianne Lavelle of the book Toxic Deception: How the Chemical Industry Manipulates Science, Bends the Law and Endangers Your Health (1997). Fagin is currently working on a book about monarch butterflies and the future of biodiversity in the Anthropocene.

Personal life
He is married to Alison Frankel, a senior legal writer at Thomson-Reuters; they have two children and live in Sea Cliff, NY.

References

External links 
Dan Fagin, official website
New York Times op-ed by Fagin about parallels between chemical industry practices in Basel (starting in the 1860s), Cincinnati, Toms River and now China.
New York Times op-ed by Fagin about a trip to Basel and outsourcing of toxic manufacturing practices.
Scientific American story by Fagin about molecular epidemiology research in China.
NPR interview with Fagin and other journalists about the state of environmental reporting.
Science, Health and Environmental Reporting Program at New York University

American non-fiction environmental writers
Environmental journalists
1963 births
Living people
Pulitzer Prize for General Non-Fiction winners
New York University faculty
Newsday people
Writers from Oklahoma City
American male journalists
20th-century American male writers
21st-century American male writers
20th-century American journalists
21st-century American journalists
20th-century American non-fiction writers
21st-century American non-fiction writers